Ellen M. McCarthy is the director of the Office of Planning for the United States city of Washington, D.C. She previously served in that position from 2004 to 2007. Appointed by Mayor Anthony Williams, She was forced out of the position by wealthy Ward 3 homeowner groups who resented her development policies.

Before then, she served as Deputy Director for Development Review, Neighborhood Planning and Historic Preservation. McCarthy was former director of the DC Downtown Partnership, a group fostering revitalization of the historic downtown section of the city. She also ran a private practice in land use and transportation planning.

Between terms, she served as Director of Planning and Land Use at the Washington office of Arent Fox.

She attended the University of Maryland, and has a Master of Urban Planning from Harvard University.

References

External links
 Office of Planning biography
 "Today at Crew" - Bisnow
 "Embassy Chef Challenge 2010" - Bisnow
 "Carr Co. Opposes District's `Living Downtown' Policy; Developer Doesn't Want Housing in Project" - The Washington Post
 "Girding For a Fight In Foggy Bottom; GWU Expansion Raises Objections" - Washington Post
 "After Defense Decision, a Realigned Landscape" - Washington Post
 "City buys time to safeguard neighborhood zoning regs" - The Common Denominator
 "Williams’ city planner pick has big job ahead" - The Common Denominator
 "Media Report Links D.C. Official to Bribery Probe" - Washington Post
 "Erase the past, see the future" - Washington Business Journal

Living people
American urban planners
Women urban planners
Government of the District of Columbia
Harvard Graduate School of Design alumni
University of Maryland, College Park alumni
Year of birth missing (living people)